The Elisabeth Haub School of Law at Pace University is the law school of Pace University located in White Plains, New York. Founded in 1976 as Pace Law School, the American Bar Association (ABA) accredited it in 1978. Pace has a top-ranked Environmental Law program.

Overview
In 2016, the law school renamed itself after Elisabeth Haub in recognition of Haub's environmental advocacy and philanthropy.  Its campus is also home to the New York State Judicial Institute, which serves as a statewide center for the education, training, and research facility for all judges and justices of the New York State Unified Court System.

Admissions
For the class starting in 2021, 48.10% of applicants were accepted by the law school, 30.47% of those accepted enrolled, and the average enrolled student had a 152 LSAT score and a 3.4 undergraduate GPA.

Bar passage rate
In 2017, 89.02% passed the bar within two years of graduation. In 2019, 84.12% passed from the jurisdiction of New York and 71.81% passed from 8 remaining jurisdictions.

Joint programs
The law school has several joint degree programs, including Yale School of the Environment's Master of Environmental Management (MEM), with Pace's Advanced Certificate in Environmental Law, an M.P.A. degree from Pace University's Dyson College of Arts and Sciences, an M.B.A. degree from Pace University's Lubin School of Business, a M.A. degree with Sarah Lawrence College in women’s studies, or a M.S. degree with Bard College Center for Environmental Policy.

Clinics 
The Pace Community Law Practice was launched in September 2012. It is a first-of-its-kind legal residency and incubator program where recent graduates serve as Fellows intensively learning legal practice under the supervision of experienced attorneys and gaining the tools to create solo and small practices.

Employment 
According to its official 2018 ABA-required disclosures, 79.51% of the Class of 2018 obtained full-time, long-term, JD-required employment or JD-advantage employment after graduation. The law School's Law School Transparency Employment Score is 71.1% for JD required employment, and its Under-Employment Score is 14.5%, indicating the percentage of the Class of 2018 unemployed, pursuing an additional degree, or working in a non-professional, short-term, or part-time job nine months after graduation.

Rankings 
In 2022, U.S. News & World Report ranked the law school #142.

Environmental Law Program

In 2022, U.S. News & World Report ranked the law school's Advanced Certificate in Environmental Law program #1 (tied with UC Berkeley School of Law and UCLA School of Law).

Notable alumni and faculty

References

External links

Pace University—Elisabeth Haub School of Law - Law School Admission Council

Pace University
Environmental law schools
Environmental law in the United States
Educational institutions established in 1976
1976 establishments in New York (state)
Law schools in New York (state)
Law schools in the New York metropolitan area